is a Japanese comedian and YouTube celebrity. 
Since August 2020, she has worked as a freelance entertainer.  
She is known for her unique way of speaking, which is considered frank by most Japanese. 
She is also known for her hair style, which often features paired "devil horns." In 2022, Fuwa-chan became a professional wrestler and is currently signed to World Wonder Ring Stardom.

Biography

After her birth in a suburb of Tokyo in 1993, Fuwa-chan followed her parents to Los Angeles, 
where she lived from second to fourth grade in elementary school before returning to Japan in 2003.  
Her father was self-employed in the import/export business and her mother was a full time homemaker.
Throughout her childhood, Fuwa-chan enjoyed devising new games and pranks. 
For example, she came up with an idea for a game that combines volleyball with shoe throwing. The voice actress, Ayane Sakura, 
who was one of her high school classmates, remarked how Fuwa-chan "was like a typhoon."

Career

In March 2017, Fuwa-chan graduated from Toyo University with a B.A. degree 
in Chinese philosophy.
During her second year at university, Fuwa-chan enrolled in the 18th class of the Watanabe Comedy School in Tokyo.
Fuwa-chan decided to launch a career as a comedian because it seemed to be her natural forte. She formed a comic duo with another female 
high school classmate. However, this partnership ended in 2014.
After that, she formed another partnership with another classmate, creating a comic duo named "SF Century Space Child." After graduating from the Watanabe Comedy School in 2014, 
Fuwa-chan joined the Watanabe Entertainment Company, but left that company after three years following a heated argument with an agency executive.

In September 2017, Fuwa-chan launched her own YouTube channel, "Fuwa-chan's Woo-woo" 
with TV Asahi director Takuro Samukawa. Then April 2018, she launched another channel
known as Fuwa-chan TV/FUWACHAN TV.
That YouTube channel had 809,000 subscribers as of 
February 11, 2022. In July 2020 Fuwa-chan met with Tokyo Governor Koike and Fuwa-chan
broadcast some messages in English and Japanese about ways to reduce the spread 
of COVID-19.

In recent years Fuwa-chan has been working as a freelance comedian, 
mainly as a solo performer. In 2020 she participated in Japanese entertainment events such as the 
"R-1 Gran Prix" and in the "Final Battle of the W Competition" for the best female
entertainer, an event jointly operated by Yoshimoto Kogyo and Nippon Television.
As a result, Fuwa-chan's TV appearances increased sharply.
She also became general MC of the TVTokyo show, "Shichōsha-sama ni kawaretai!" [I want to be kept by my viewers!] in August 2020.

In July 2020 Fuwa-chan received the Japan Council for Better Radio and Television's
monthly "Galaxy Award" for "Notable Talent."

As a testament to her popularity, Jiyu Kokuminsha recognized "Fuwa-chan" as
one of the most popular Japanese buzzwords in 2020 along with "Abenomask" and 
"Ai no Fuchaku".

The noted sociologist Shōichi Ōta summarized Fuwa-chan's status by stating, "Fuwa-chan is like a mirror that reflects 
contemporary [Japanese] TV and society. We should keep an eye on her."

Professional wrestling career

World Wonder Ring Stardom (2022-present)
Fuwa-chan made her professional wrestling debut in World Wonder Ring Stardom on the first night of the 2022 edition of the Goddesses of Stardom Tag League which took place on October 23, where she teamed up with Hazuki in a losing effort against Queen's Quest's Saya Kamitani and Hina.

References 

1993 births
People from Hachiōji, Tokyo
Comedians from Tokyo
Japanese Internet celebrities
Toyo University alumni
Japanese women comedians
Japanese YouTubers
Living people